Fondue is a Swiss melted cheese and wine dish served in a communal pot (caquelon or fondue pot) over a portable stove heated with a candle or spirit lamp, and eaten by dipping bread into the cheese using long-stemmed forks. It was promoted as a Swiss national dish by the Swiss Cheese Union (Schweizerische Käseunion) in the 1930s, and was popularized in North America in the 1960s.

Since the 1950s, the term "fondue" has been generalized to other dishes in which a food is dipped into a communal pot of liquid kept hot in a fondue pot: chocolate fondue, fondue au chocolat, in which pieces of fruit or pastry are dipped into a melted chocolate mixture, and fondue bourguignonne, in which pieces of meat are cooked in hot oil or broth.

Etymology
The word fondue is the feminine passive past participle of the French verb  'to melt' and so means 'melted'; it is used as a noun. It is first attested in French in 1735, in Vincent La Chapelle's Cuisinier moderne, and in English in 1878.

History
The earliest known recipe for the modern form of cheese fondue comes from a 1699 book published in Zürich, under the name "Käss mit Wein zu kochen" 'to cook cheese with wine'. It calls for grated or cut-up cheese to be melted with wine, and for bread to be dipped in it.

However, the name "cheese fondue", until the late 19th century, referred to a dish composed of eggs and cheese, as in la Chapelle's 1735 Fonduë de Fromage, aux Truffes Fraiches; it was something between scrambled eggs with cheese and a cheese soufflé. Brillat-Savarin wrote in 1834 that it is "nothing other than scrambled eggs with cheese". Variations included cream ("à la genevoise") and truffles ("à la piémontaise") in addition to eggs, as well as what is now called "raclette" ("fondue valaisanne").

The first known recipe for the modern cheese fondue under that name, with cheese and wine but no eggs, was published in 1875, and was already presented as a Swiss national dish. Despite its modern associations with rustic mountain life, it was a town-dweller's dish from the lowlands of western, French-speaking, Switzerland: rich cheese like Gruyère was a valuable export item which peasants could not afford to eat.

With the introduction of corn starch to Switzerland in 1905, it became easier to make a smooth and stable emulsion of the wine and cheese, and this probably contributed to the success of fondue.

Fondue was popularized as a Swiss national dish by the Swiss Cheese Union (Schweizerische Käseunion) in the 1930s as a way of increasing cheese consumption. The Swiss Cheese Union also created pseudo-regional recipes as part of the "spiritual defence of Switzerland". After World War II rationing ended, the Swiss Cheese Union continued its marketing campaign, sending fondue sets to military regiments and event organizers across Switzerland. Fondue is now a symbol of Swiss unity. Fondue is also often associated with mountains and winter sports.

In the meantime, fondue continued to be promoted aggressively in Switzerland, with slogans like "La fondue crée la bonne humeur" 'fondue creates a good mood' and (1981, in Swiss German) "Fondue isch guet und git e gueti Luune" 'fondue is good and creates a good mood' – abbreviated as "figugegl".

Fondue was promoted to Americans at the Swiss Pavilion's Alpine restaurant at the 1964 New York World's Fair.

Fondue was popular in the United States in the 1960s and 1970s, along with other foods made in chafing dishes.

The extension of the name "fondue" to other dishes served in a communal hot pot dates to 1950s New York. Konrad Egli, a Swiss restaurateur, introduced fondue bourguignonne at his Chalet Suisse restaurant in 1956. In the mid-1960s, he invented chocolate fondue as part of a promotion for Toblerone chocolate.

Preparation

Cheese fondue consists of a blend of cheeses, wine, and seasoning, although there are many variations, such as using beer rather than wine. Traditionally, the caquelon is rubbed with a cut garlic clove, white wine is added and heated with cornstarch, and then grated cheese is added and gently stirred until melted, although in practice all the ingredients can be combined and heated together at once. Some kirsch is often added. Fondue is very easy to prepare, even in large quantities. The cornstarch or other starch stabilizes and thickens the mixture. Additional wine may be added if the fondue is too thick; its acid and ethanol decrease the fondue's viscosity.  A fondue can curdle if the protein separates from the fat, which is usually the result of not enough liquid in the mixture and an insufficiently acid mixture, so lemon juice is sometimes added.

Temperature and la religieuse
A cheese fondue mixture should be kept warm enough to keep the fondue smooth and liquid but not so hot that it burns. If this temperature is held until the fondue is finished there will be a thin crust of toasted (not burnt) cheese at the bottom of the caquelon. This is called la religieuse (French for the nun). It has the texture of a cracker and is almost always lifted out and eaten.

Variants

Swiss

The regional names used for some of these variants are factitious, and do not reflect genuine regional traditions.
 Vaudoise: Gruyère.
 Fribourgeoise, from Fribourg:  Vacherin Fribourgeois à fondue, wherein potatoes are often dipped instead of bread. This is the only cheese fondue that does not use wine. The cheese is melted in a few tablespoons of water over low heat.
 Moitié-moitié (or half and half), also called Fondue Suisse: Gruyère and Vacherin Fribourgeois.
 Neuchâteloise: Gruyère and Emmental (sometimes referred to as the original or traditional fondue).
 Innerschweiz: Gruyère, Emmental, and Sbrinz.
 Genevoise: Gruyère (preferably of several stages of maturity) with a little Emmentaler and Valais cheese. Sometimes chopped sautéed morels are added.
 Interlaken: Gruyère, Appenzeller, Emmental.
 Appenzeller: Appenzeller cheese with cream added.
 Tomato: Gruyère, Emmental, crushed tomatoes, and wine.
 Spicy: Gruyère, red and green peppers, with chili.
 Mushroom: Gruyère, Vacherin Fribourgeois, and mushrooms.

French
 Savoyarde: Comté, Beaufort and one or two other local cheese like Reblochon, Abondance, or French equivalent of Gruyère.
 Jurassienne: Mature or mild Comté.
 Auvergnate: Saint-Nectaire, Cantal and Fourme d'Ambert

Italian alpine
 Valdôtaine ( or ): Fontina, milk, and eggs, typical of the Aosta Valley
 Fonduta piemontese in Piedmont.

Prepared convenience food 
Refrigerated fondue blends are sold in most Swiss supermarkets as convenience food and need little more than melting in the caquelon. Individual portions heatable in a microwave oven are also sold.

Consumption and etiquette

Fondue is eaten by spearing a piece of bread on a fork, swirling it in the pot, and putting it into the mouth. Some writers recommend that the dipping fork be used only to transport the food from the pot to one's plate, not to eat from.

Losing a piece of bread in the caquelon is said to be penalized by buying a round of drinks, singing a song, or running around in the snow naked. This is parodied in Asterix in Switzerland, where a character is sentenced to be drowned in Lake Geneva after losing his third piece of bread.

There are various recommendations on the choice of accompanying beverage: some say white wine, others specify black tea. Some drink spirits during or after the meal, which supposedly helps digestion. Indeed, alcohol may provide short-term relief, but overall, it delays gastric emptying and prolongs perceived fullness. The delayed, strong feeling of fullness after eating fondue may be caused by phase separation in the stomach, the cheese fat initially floating in the stomach not being released into the duodenum, delaying fat sensing and satiation.

See also

 List of fondues, other dishes inspired from fondue
 Bagna càuda, a similar olive oil–based Northern Italian dish.
 List of dips
 Hot pot
 List of bread dishes
 List of cheese dishes
 List of cheese soups
 Raclette, another popular Swiss melted cheese dish

References

Further reading
 Fondue as a social event 
 Isabelle Raboud-Schüle, "Comment la fondue vint aux Suisses", Annales fribourgeoises 72:101–112 (2010)
 Swiss Fondue - The fine art of fondue in 52 tasty recipes

External links

 
 Bon Appetit Europe, Section 19:25 to 26:00 of the episode, Series: Bon Appetit Europe, Part 1, DW-TV 12 January 2016, also on YouTube (cut section only)
 Fondue with dried meat crumble, Haute Fondue, Helvetiq, Valais/Wallis Promotion, also on YouTube

Bread dishes
Cheese dishes
Communal eating
Cooking techniques
National dishes
Swiss cuisine
French cuisine
Italian cuisine
Table-cooked dishes
Wine dishes